Siege of Ghent may refer to:
 Siege of Ghent (1380–1386), by Charles VI of France during the Flemish Revolt
 Siege of Ghent (1583–1584), by Spanish general Alexander Farnese, Duke of Parma, against the defending Calvinist Republic of Ghent during the Eighty Years' War
 Siege of Ghent (1708), by British general John Churchill, 1st Duke of Marlborough, against the defending French Count de la Motte during the War of the Spanish Succession
 Four Days of Ghent (1789), a four-day siege by Patriot captain Jean-Baptiste Davaine against the defending Imperial Austrian army during the Brabant Revolution

See also 
 Revolt of Ghent (disambiguation)